Godeok Station is a subway station on Seoul Subway Line 5 in Gangdong-gu, Seoul. It links to Baejae High School, Myungil High School, Gwangmun High School, Hanyoung High School, and Hanyoung Foreign Language High School. It will be part of Seoul Subway Line 9 in 2027.

Station layout

References 

Railway stations opened in 1995
Seoul Metropolitan Subway stations
Metro stations in Gangdong District
Seoul Subway Line 5
Seoul Subway Line 9
1995 establishments in South Korea
20th-century architecture in South Korea